Sílvia Pérez Cruz (born 15 February 1983) is a Spanish and Catalan singer.  In 2012, she recorded her first solo album, 11 de Novembre, which was nominated for album of the year in both Spain and France. A song performed by her, "No Te Puedo Encontrar", received a Goya Award for best original song for 2012. In 2014, she released her album Granada. Both releases have been in collaboration with Raül Fernández Miró. She received another Goya Award for best original song, for the song "Ai, ai, ai", composed and performed by her, from the film "Cerca de tu casa" (2016).

Background
Cruz's parents were both singers who sang together.  Her mother Glòria Cruz i Torrellas taught her to play the saxophone and piano as well as how to dance and sculpt.  Her father Càstor Pérez Diz was a self-taught guitarist. She has a daughter.

She went to Catalonia College of Music in Barcelona, where she received classical training studying the piano and saxophone and receiving a degree in vocal jazz. While she was at Catalonia College of Music, she and three other women founded a flamenco group called Las Migas. They combined their different musical approaches to create a new type of flamenco.  It was not long after this that she became well known in the Spanish music scene.

Cruz told NPR that a song must have a story. She believes that her view of songs as stories comes from her mother who was a singer and storyteller.  Her mother, she said, also viewed songs as stories.

11 de Novembre
In 2012, Cruz released her album 11 de Novembre with Raül Refree. She met Miró in 2006 and they toured together in Mexico, Argentina, and Brazil. Miró was both guitarist and producer for the album. Their songs have been described as a blend of music genres including Fado, jazz improvisation, and flamenco. Cruz won a Goya Award, Spain's most prestigious film award, for best original song "No Te Puedo Encontrar" in the film Blancanieves. The album received a Gold Award disc.

Granada
In 2014, Cruz released her second album Granada, again collaborating with Raül Refree. It reflects Cruz's practice of singing in multiple languages: French, German, English, and four Iberian languages. Included on the album is the song "El Cant Dells Ocells," a Catalan folk song previously made famous by Pablo Casals. Another song is "Gallo Rojo, Gallo Negro", a well-known song from the Spanish Civil War. Cruz first understood the story in the song when she was part of a concert honoring the remaining veterans of the International Brigades who fought against the Nationales in the civil war. Cruz told NPR that she saw tears in the veterans' eyes when they sang the song in their own language.  She said, "These people have lived through so much. It's good that I can sing and help them remember." As journalist Betto Arcos concluded, this example illustrates how Cruz comes to understand the stories in the songs she sings.

References

External links

 Silvia Perez Cruz on Myspace
 Silvia Perez Cruz on Facebook

1983 births
People from Baix Empordà
Singers from Catalonia
Living people
21st-century Spanish singers
21st-century Spanish women singers